= Positio =

Step toward becoming a Catholic saint

A positio (short for the Latin positio super virtutibus: "position on the virtues") is a document or collection of documents used in the process by which a Catholic person is declared Venerable, the second of four steps on the path to canonization as a saint.

== Description ==
A positio is a formal brief arguing for the canonization of an individual in the Catholic Church. Before canonization, the formal declaration by the pope that a person is a saint, there is a long process, with various intermediate steps. First, a person whose holiness is being investigated (by a postulator, appointed by the Pope) is referred to as a Servant of God. The very fact of appointing a postulator means that the process of beatification has been activated.

If investigations reveal that the person was indeed holy enough, then a "formal argument for sainthood", the positio, is presented to the Dicastery for the Causes of Saints. This document contains the informatio, or life story, of the Servant of God under investigation, as well as a series of documents and testimonies to support the cause (summarium). In short, the positio collects the evidence obtained by a diocesan inquiry into a candidate's heroic virtues.

Upon presentation, the positio is examined by a committee of expert historians and theologians, and if they find the evidence presented suitable, they may then make a recommendation to the Pope that the candidate be declared Venerable—that is, worthy of the devotion of Catholic believers.

A positio can run to over 1,000 pages in length. The time between the preparation of a positio and a recommendation by the committee of historians and theologians can often be decades.
